"The Dutchman" is a song written by Michael Peter Smith in 1968 and popularized by Liam Clancy, Brendan Grace and Steve Goodman. At the time Smith wrote the song, he had never visited the Netherlands.

The song is about an elderly couple living in Amsterdam, Margaret and the title character. The unnamed Dutchman is senile, and Margaret cares for him with a sadness over what has happened to him over the years. It is a story of unconditional love. One of the most notable and successful versions was recorded by Irish comedian and entertainer Brendan Grace.

Covers
While Goodman's cover version of "The Dutchman" is one of the best known, along with a cover by Irish artists Liam Clancy and Tommy Makem, the song has been covered by many other artists as well, including Bernard Wrigley, John Gorka, Suzy Bogguss, Norm Hacking, Anne Hills, John McDermott (No. 18 Canada), The New Kingston Trio, The Shaw Brothers, Gamble Rogers, Tom Russell, Jerry Jeff Walker, Robert James Waller, Cashman & West, Josh White Jr., Woods Tea Company, Keith Harkin, Celtic Thunder, David Soul, The Quiggs, Brendan Grace, Danny Doyle, The High Kings.

References

1968 songs
American folk songs
Songs about Amsterdam